Arthur Robert Hogg (25 November 1903 – 31 March 1966) was an Australian physicist and astronomer.

He was born in Melbourne, Victoria, was educated at the Royal Melbourne Institute of Technology and at the University of Melbourne where he earned his B.Sc. in 1923 and M.Sc. in 1925. In 1927 he began working at the Broken Hill Associated Smelters in Port Pirie, South Australia, becoming the assistant supervisor of research, and he remained there until 1929. He then joined the Mount Stromlo Observatory, then called the Commonwealth Solar Observatory, as an assistant and he remained associated with the observatory until his death in 1966.

At Mount Stromlo, he took up the study of electrical phenomena in the atmosphere, including ionization in the lower atmosphere. He then transitioned into the study of cosmic rays. In 1933 he was married to Irene Doris Tyson (known as Yandell). The  couple had two sons, Robert Ernest Tremayne born in 1936 and Garth Richard born in 1940 and a daughter, Elizabeth Irene born in 1946.

Beginning in 1940, near the start of World War II, he worked as a physicist in the Chemical Defence Section at the Munitions Supply Laboratories in Maribyrnong. There his work was focused on the study of respirators. In 1944 he became secretary of the Physical and Meteorological Sub-Committee at the Lab.

After the war he returned to work at observatory. He was awarded his Ph.D. in 1950 from the University of Melbourne, based on his study of cosmic rays. He now began astronomical studies using photoelectric photometry and produced a series of papers on eclipsing variables, globular clusters in the galaxy, and the magellanic clouds.

He also became involved in the administration of the observatory and played a leading role in establishing the new  telescope. Later he selected Siding Spring Mountain as the site of a  telescope, located further from the encroaching growth near the older observatory. He was the deputy director of the Mount Stromlo Observatory from 1961 to 1966.

Hogg served in other positions of note, including as president of the Royal Society of Canberra in 1954; chairman of the Australian Institute of Physics, Australian Capital Territory branch, 1964; and the Commission 6 on Astronomical Telegrams of the International Astronomical Union from 1961 until 1964.

Awards and honors
 Fellow of the Australian Institute of Physics.
 Fellow of the Australian Academy of Science, 1954.
 The crater Hogg on the Moon is co-named for Arthur Hogg and Frank S. Hogg.

References
 Hogg, Arthur Robert (1903-1966), Encyclopaedia of Australian Science.
 Arthur Robert Hogg 1903-1966, Biographical Memoirs, Australian Academy of ScienceOriginally published in Records of the Australian Academy of Science, vol. 1, no. 3, Canberra, Australia, 1968.
 HOGG, Arthur Robert, Physicists in Australia to 1945.

1903 births
1966 deaths
20th-century Australian astronomers
Fellows of the Australian Academy of Science
Fellows of the Australian Institute of Physics
Place of death missing